Werner Zerweck (14 March 1899 in Munich – 10 September 1965) was a German chemist, inventor and industrial leader, who served as CEO of the chemical and pharmaceutical company Cassella (later merged to become part of Sanofi) from 1953 to 1963. Under his leadership the company focused increasingly on pharmaceuticals and cosmetics rather than its former primary focus, dyes. He was also a member of the advisory board of Deutsche Bank from 1953. Zerweck was one of the pioneers in the development of synthetic fibers.

Career

He studied chemistry at the Technical University of Munich under the Nobel Prize-winning chemists Heinrich Otto Wieland and Hans Fischer, and obtained his doctorate in 1922 with Fischer as his doctoral advisor. He then worked for two years as Fischer's assistant, and was employed as a researcher at Cassella from 1924 after being recommended to the company by Fischer. He first worked in the research laboratory led by Arthur von Weinberg; he later worked closely with Richard Herz. In 1932 he became joint head of research together with Otto Bayer; after Otto Bayer had left Cassella to join Bayer the following year, Zerweck became Cassella's sole head of research. He received power of procuration in 1936 and became deputy head of the Cassella works in 1939. He was vice chairman of the board of directors (i.e. deputy CEO) from 1947 and chairman of the board of directors (i.e. CEO) of Cassella from 1953, and simultaneously continued to head its research activities. He was also a member of the supervisory board from 1956. He retired as CEO on 31 December 1963.

In 1950, he became Honorary Professor of chemical engineering at the University of Erlangen-Nuremberg. He became a member of the advisory board of Deutsche Bank in 1953.

The Prof. Dr. Zerweck/Cassella Foundation (Prof. Dr. Zerweck-/Cassella-Stiftung) was established in 1966 and named in his honour. He was the (co-)inventor of numerous chemical and pharmaceutical patents.

Honours
Order of Merit of the Federal Republic of Germany (1953)

Selected publications
Hans Fischer, Werner Zerweck, "Über den Harnfarbstoff bei normalen und pathologischen Verhältnissen und seine lichtschützende Wirkung. Zugleich einige Beiträge zur Kenntnis der Porphyrinurie," Hoppe-Seyler's Zeitschrift für physiologische Chemie (= Biological Chemistry). Volume 137, Issue 3–6, Pages 176–241, 
Hans Fischer, Werner Zerweck, "Zur Kenntnis der natürlichen Porphyrine. 7. Mitteilung. Über Uroporphyrinogen-heptamethylester und eine neue Überführung von Uro- in Koproporphyrin," Hoppe-Seyler's Zeitschrift für physiologische Chemie (= Biological Chemistry). Volume 137, Issue 3–6, Pages 242–264, 
Hans Fischer, Werner Zerweck, "Zur Kenntnis der Pyrrole, 1. Mitteilung: Über Pyrrol-aldehyde", Berichte der deutschen chemischen Gesellschaft, Volume 55, Issue 6, pages 1942–1949, 1922, 
Hans Fischer, Werner Zerweck, "Zur Kenntnis der Pyrrole, 2. Mitteilung: Nitrierung von substituierten Pyrrolen". Berichte der deutschen chemischen Gesellschaft, Volume 55, Issue 6, pages 1949–1955, 1922, 
Hans Fischer, Werner Zerweck, "Zur Kenntnis der Pyrrole, 4. Mitteilung: Über Pyrrol-aldehyde (II.) und über Pyrrol-nitrile," Berichte der deutschen chemischen Gesellschaft, Volume 56, Issue 2, pages 519–527, 1923, 
Hans Fischer, Karl Schneller, Werner Zerweck, "Zur Kenntnis der Pyrrole, 3. Mitteilung: Über Ketone, Ketonsäure-ester und Ketonsäure-nitrile substituierter Pyrrole," Berichte der deutschen chemischen Gesellschaft, Volume 55, Issue 8, pages 2390–2403, 1922,

References

1899 births
1965 deaths
20th-century German chemists
Cassella people
German chief executives
Academic staff of the University of Erlangen-Nuremberg
Scientists from Munich
Scientists from Frankfurt
Recipients of the Cross of the Order of Merit of the Federal Republic of Germany
Technical University of Munich alumni